Captain Caveman and the Teen Angels is an American animated mystery comedy series created by Joe Ruby and Ken Spears and produced by Hanna-Barbera Productions for ABC. The series aired during the network's Saturday morning schedule from September 10, 1977, to June 21, 1980. All 40 episodes are available on the Boomerang subscription app.

Summary
The series follows the mystery-solving adventures of the Teen Angels—Brenda, Dee Dee and Taffy—and their friend Captain Caveman (or Cavey for short), a prehistoric caveman and superhero whom the girls discovered and thawed from a block of ice. The concept and general plot for the show was seen as a parody of Charlie's Angels (which also aired on ABC). The show also borrowed heavily from other Hanna-Barbera shows such as Scooby-Doo and The Flintstones.

Captain Caveman's powers include super-strength, a variety of useful objects hidden inside his hair, and a club that allows him to fly and from which pop out different tools he uses to fight crime. His trademark is his battle cry of "Captain CAAAAAVEMAAAAAAANNNN!" Captain Caveman's voice was provided by Mel Blanc.

A total of forty 11-minute episodes ran for three seasons from 1977 to 1980: sixteen episodes were produced as segments of Scooby's All-Star Laff-A-Lympics in 1977, eight episodes were produced as segments of Scooby's All-Stars in 1978 and sixteen episodes were produced in 1980 when Captain Caveman and the Teen Angels were given their own half-hour show which combined new episodes and reruns from 1977 to 1978. Captain Caveman and the Teen Angels also participated in sporting competitions as part of "The Scooby Doobies" team on the half-hour Laff-A-Lympics segment. Like many animated series created by Hanna-Barbera in the 1970s, the show contained a laugh track, one of the last Hanna-Barbera productions to do so.

Characters
The series features the following four main characters throughout its run:

 Captain Caveman, or "Cavey" for short (voiced by Mel Blanc), is the protagonist of the show, billed as "the world's first superhero." He is a caveman who is millennia old (his exact age is never disclosed, although in an episode he is carded by a doorman who is unsure Cavey is old enough to let in, to which Captain Caveman responds, "I'll be 2 million next month."). He can pull various objects from his long body hair that covers his body except for his nose, arms, and legs. He can also fly, but his flying power always seems to fail him at the worst possible moment. Sometimes he would attribute this mishap to an energy shortage ("Uh oh! Bad time for energy crisis." CRASH!), which was a reference to the gasoline rationing shortages of the late 1970s. He speaks in stereotypical "caveman-talk", replacing subject pronouns with their object equivalents and dropping articles such as "the" (for example, "Me know where bad guys are hiding."), and often mumbles the nonsense phrase "unga bunga". He also has a bad habit of occasionally eating large non-food objects in one gulp (i.e. bicycles, TV sets, safes, table lamps), and the Teen Angels occasionally have to stop him from eating potential clues that will help them to solve the mystery. Despite this, Cavey is ultimately loyal to them and he is very capable capturing culprits.
Dee Dee Skyes (voiced by Vernee Watson) is the brains of the Teen Angels and acts as their unofficial leader. Dee Dee and the rest of the Teen Angels found the frozen Captain Caveman and defrosted him. She wears her hair in an afro and usually wears a red turtleneck sweater with a blue skirt and red knee high boots. Both her dress style and her knack for solving mysteries make her similar to Velma Dinkley of Scooby-Doo fame, while she also bears a resemblance to Valerie from Josie and the Pussycats (Dee-Dee is African-American just like Valerie). She is misidentified as Brenda in the opening credits. Though some sources give the family name of both Dee Dee and her uncle Frank as "Sykes", their name is given as "Skyes" in the episode "The Fur Freight Fright", which featured Frank and his company "Skye's Furs". Her adaptation in the 2020 film Scoob! as Blue Falcon's assistant (voiced by Kiersey Clemons) also introduced herself as Dee Dee Skyes, and she is listed as such in the closing credits. 
Brenda Chance (voiced by Marilyn Schreffler) is a nervous brunette who is always scared of the demons, monsters and phantoms that she encounters and always tries to back out of a scary mystery similar to that of Shaggy Rogers, but always ends up getting captured or the short end of the stick. She wears a purple striped tank top and a pair of hot pink flared trousers with a white belt. She also acts as Dee Dee's sergeant of the Teen Angels. She is misidentified as Dee Dee in the opening credits.
Taffy Dare (voiced by Laurel Page) is the blonde member of the group, renowned for her cry of "Zowie!" whenever she comes up with a plan (or "Another Daffy Taffy Plan" as Brenda and Cavey would call it) to catch the culprits, has a distinct, flirtatious, childlike persona and a New York-influenced/Southern accent. In spite of her usually zany plans and ditziness, Taffy is actually very capable and clever. She has the ability to seduce Caveman into acting as bait for her plans to capture the culprit. She wears a green dress with matching shoes. She also acts as Dee Dee's second-in-command of the Teen Angels. It is revealed that Captain Caveman has a crush on her and vice versa.

Opening and closing credits
The opening credits for each episode consisted of voice-over narration by Gary Owens:
Set free by the Teen Angels from his prehistoric block of glacier ice, comes the world's first superhero, Captain Caveman! Now the constant companion to the Teen Angels—Brenda, Dee Dee and Taffy—in their hilarious, and sometimes scary mystery missions. Get ready for Captain Caveman and the Teen Angels!

The music heard in the closing credits is the CB Bears theme. After the first three screens, the end credit roll is from the original two-hour version of Scooby's All-Star Laff-A-Lympics.

Broadcast history
Captain Caveman and the Teen Angels was broadcast in these following formats on ABC:

 Scooby's All-Star Laff-A-Lympics (September 10, 1977 – September 2, 1978, ABC Saturday)
 Scooby's All-Stars (September 9, 1978 – September 8, 1979, ABC Saturday)
 Captain Caveman and the Teen Angels (March 8, 1980 – June 21, 1980, ABC Saturday)

Broadcast schedules (all EDT):

September 10, 1977 – July 1978, ABC Saturday 9:00-11:00 a.m.
July 1978 – September 2, 1978, ABC Saturday 9:30-11:30 a.m.
September 9, 1978 – November 1978, ABC Saturday 10:00-11:30 a.m.
November 1978 – May 1979, ABC Saturday 8:00-9:30 a.m.
May 1979 – September 8, 1979, ABC Saturday 8:30-10:00 a.m.
March 8, 1980 – June 21, 1980, ABC Saturday 11:30-12:00 noon

Episodes

Season 1 – Scooby's All Star Laff-A-Lympics (1977)

Season 2 – Scooby's All Stars (1978)

Season 3 (1980)

Cast
 Mel Blanc as Captain Caveman
 Laurel Page as Taffy Dare
 Marilyn Schreffler as Brenda Chance
 Vernee Watson-Johnson as Dee Dee Skyes
 Gary Owens as Narrator

Later appearances

The Flintstone Comedy Show (1980–82)
In November 1980, Captain Caveman began to star in segments of his own on The Flintstone Comedy Show, one of many spin-offs of Hanna-Barbera's popular prime-time show The Flintstones, often in a role similar to that of Superman. Captain Caveman worked at The Daily Granite newspaper with Wilma Flintstone and Betty Rubble. His "secret identity" was Chester the office boy. To disguise himself as Chester, Captain Caveman wore a pair of glasses and a tie. Despite the simplicity of his disguise, he required a coat rack and an elaborate transformation sequence to become Captain Caveman.

The Flintstone Kids (1986–88)
In 1986, Captain Caveman appeared in a backup segment of The Flintstone Kids called Captain Caveman and Son with his son Cavey Jr. (voiced by Charlie Adler). In this case he appeared on a show-within-a-show that the younger versions of Fred, Barney, Wilma, and Betty enjoyed watching; the Captain's mumbled "unga bunga" became a catchphrase that the kids would shout before watching each "episode" of the show. The show would involve a lesson the Flintstone kids were trying to learn in the prologue. The whole "secret identity" idea was also ignored or forgotten.

Hanna-Barbera Cinematic Universe
Captain Caveman and Dee Dee Skyes appeared in the animated Scooby-Doo film Scoob! with 
Captain Caveman voiced by Tracy Morgan and Dee Dee voiced by Kiersey Clemons. Dee Dee appears as the pilot of the Falcon Fury and assistant of the Blue Falcon. Captain Caveman is an inhabitant of a prehistoric ecosystem under Messick Mountain and part of a tribe with long body hair like him and is capable of speaking proper English.

Captain Caveman appears in the 2021 film Space Jam: A New Legacy. His design is the same from Scoob! Captain Caveman is seen watching the basketball game between the Tune Squad and the Goon Squad while swinging from the overhead power line that Magilla Gorilla was riding his unicycle on.

Other appearances
 A very similar pair of characters, the Slag Brothers, made appearances in the earlier Hanna-Barbera series, Wacky Races. They served as the inspiration for Captain Caveman.
 Captain Caveman later appeared in the Harvey Birdman, Attorney at Law episode "The Evolutionary War", with Captain Caveman voiced by Chris Edgerly and Cavey Jr. voiced by Maurice LaMarche. Captain Caveman turns to Harvey Birdman to represent him when Cavey Jr.'s school won't teach evolution.
 Captain Caveman appeared in the Robot Chicken episode "Ban on the Fun", voiced by Breckin Meyer. In a segment that parodies Laff-A-Lympics in the style of the Munich massacre, Captain Caveman and Shaggy Rogers confront Daisy Mayhem and the former blows her up with the "wrong club".
 Characters that look very similar to Captain Caveman appear as enemies in the 8-bit computer game Renegade III: The Final Chapter.
 In a Halloween-themed episode of Homestar Runner, Homsar is dressed up in a Captain Caveman-like costume. During the episode, he exclaims "DaAaAaA! I'm the Captain Caveman of the graveyard train!"
 In the Family Guy episode, "Perfect Castaway", Peter Griffin expresses how much he misses Captain Caveman, and vows that he will see him again once he gets off the deserted island he is trapped.
 Captain Caveman makes a cameo appearance in an episode of Adventure Time, where he is seen as a stuffed doll in Finn's room.
 Captain Caveman appeared in the Scooby-Doo! Mystery Incorporated episode, "Mystery Solvers Club State Finals", voiced by Jim Cummings. He and the Teen Angels appear alongside other Hanna-Barbera detective teams from Jabberjaw, Speed Buggy, and The Funky Phantom in a fever dream of Scooby-Doo's.
 In Scooby-Doo! Mask of the Blue Falcon, a person cosplaying as Captain Caveman makes an appearance in a Hanna-Barbera-themed convention.
 Captain Caveman is seen briefly in the background of South Park - Imaginationland: The Movie (2008). He is seen amongst a plethora of other imaginary and cartoon characters as they are being attacked by terrorists.
 Captain Caveman, alongside Cavey Jr. and the Teen Angels, appeared in Jellystone!, with Captain Caveman voiced by Jim Conroy, Cavey Jr. voiced by Dana Snyder, Dee Dee Sykes voiced by Niccole Thurman, Taffy Dare voiced by Grace Helbig, and Brenda Chance voiced by Georgie Kidder. The Teen Angels work as reporters and are young adults. As a result, they are referred to as the "Young Adult Angels".
 Captain Caveman appeared in the Yabba Dabba Dinosaurs episode "Caveman Begins" (2020), voiced by Tom Megalis.
 Captain Caveman appeared in the 2021 special Scooby-Doo, Where Are You Now!
 Captain Caveman appears as a mascot display and as two costumes worn by individuals in the Crystal Cave in Velma season 1, episode 5 on HBO Max. He is also the idol of worship for a cult.

Comic books
 Captain Caveman and the Teen Angels appeared in all 13 issues of Laff-A-Lympics (Marvel Comics, 1978–79) as members of the Scooby Doobies.
 Cavey and the Angels appeared in the first issue of the short-lived Hanna-Barbera TV Stars (Marvel, August 1978).
 Cavey and the Angels team up with Mystery, Inc. in Scooby-Doo #9 (Marvel, February 1979).
 In 2018, Captain Caveman and the Teen Angels (excluding Brenda) appeared in a backup story in the DC comic Aquaman/Jabberjaw Special #1. In this story, the wizard Shazam transports the powerful hominid from prehistoric times to the present to settle an argument with the Spectre about whether heroism is strictly a trait of modern man or early man.

Production credits
 Executive Producers: Joseph Barbera and William Hanna
 Producers: Don Jurwich, Alex Lovy, Art Scott
 Director: Charles A. Nichols, Ray Patterson, Carl Urbano
 Creative Producer: Iwao Takamoto
 Created by: Joe Ruby and Ken Spears
 Associate Producers: Alex Lovy, Lew Marshall, Art Scott
 Story Editors: Andy Heyward, Tom Dagenais, Norman Maurer, Ray Parker, Duane Poole, Dick Robbins, Joe Ruby, Ken Spears
 Story: Neal Barbera, Larz Bourne, Bill Butler, Tom Dagenais, Earl Doud, Fred Freiberger, Donald Glut, Dave Ketchum, Larry Markes, Jack Mendelsohn, Duane Poole, Dalton Sandifer, John Strong, Paul West, Neal Barbera, Bob Ogle, Michael Maurer, Chuck Couch, Howard Post, Lee Davenport, Paul Pumpian, Orville Hampton, Kimmer Ringwald, Mark Jones, Jeffrey Scott, Joan Maurer, Susan Misty Stewart, Ruth Filppen, Bill Lutz, Lee Orgel, Deirdre Starlight, Gene Thompson, Harry Winkler, Jameson Brewer
 Story Direction: Bill Ackerman, Alvaro Arce, John Bruno, Ron Campbell, Bob Dranko, Carl Fallberg, David Hanan, Jan Green, Mike Kawaguchi, Michael O'Connor, Tom Patton, Don Sheppard, George Singer, Paul Sommer, Howard Swift, Kay Wright
 Recording Directors: Wally Burr, Alex Lovy, Art Scott
 Voices: Marlene Aragon, John Astin, Mel Blanc, Richard Blackburn, Michael Bell, Julie Bennett, Joe Besser, Daws Butler, Bill Callaway, Ted Cassidy, Stefanianna Christopherson, Henry Corden, Jackie Coogan, Regis Cordic, Scatman Crothers, Jeff David, Robert Denison, Micky Dolenz, Al Fann, Ron Feinberg, Joan Gerber, Virginia Gregg, Florence Halop, Pat Harrington, Hilly Hicks, Hettie Lynn Hurtes, Linda Hutson, Nicole Jaffe, Ralph James, Ann Jillian, Carolyn Jones, Casey Kasem, Ted Knight, Billy Lester, Mario Machado, Jim MacGeorge, Chuck McCann, Larry McCormick, Julie McWhirter, Shirley Mitchell, Allan Melvin, Don Messick, Heather North, Alan Oppenheimer, Bill Overton, Gary Owens, Laurel Page, Vic Perrin, Barney Phillips, Cindy Putnam, Richard Ramos, Alan Reed, Barry Richards, Bob Ridgely, Mike Road, George A. Robertson, Jr., Michael Rye, Marilyn Schreffler, Ronnie Schell, Hal Smith, Olan Soule, John Stephenson, Susan Steward, Michael Stull, Pat Stevens, Alexis Tramunti, Vincent Van Patten, Jean Vander Pyl, Janet Waldo, John Vernon, Vernee Watson, Frank Welker, Lennie Weinrib, Bill Woodson
 Title Design: Bill Pérez
 Graphics: Iraj Paran, Tom Wogatzke 
 Musical Directors: Hoyt Curtin, Ted Nichols
 Musical Supervisors: Paul DeKorte, La-La Productions
 Character Designers: Steve Nakagawa, Lew Ott, Bob Singer, Alex Toth, Dick Ung, Don Ung, George Wheeler, Donna Zeller
 Key Layouts: Larry Huber, Warren Marshall, Terry Morgan 
 Layout: Pete Alvarado, Álvaro Arce, Tom Bailey, Dale Barnhart, Lyle Beddes, Dick Bickenbach, John Bruno, Al Budnick, Nino Carbe, Todd Curtis, Charlie Downs, Chuck Downs, David Elvin, Owen Fitzgerald, Hak Fico, Owen Fitzgerald, Jim Fletcher, Bob Foster, Rene Garcia, Drew Gentle, Moe Gollub, Rick Gonzáles, Paul Gruwell, Kirk Henderson, Jack Huber, Alex Ignatiev, Ray Jacobs, Homer Jonas, Bill Lignante, Warren Marshall, Jim Mueller, Dan Noonan, Lance Noonan, Floyd Norman, Lew Ott, Greg Reyna, Tom Roth, Keith Sargent, Glenn Schmitz, Peter See, Terry Slade, Roy Smith, Martin Taras, Toby, John Tucker, Mario Uribe, Wendell Washer, John Walker, Al Wilson, Grant Wilson, Ilych Yamov
 Unit Director: Ray Patterson
 Animation Supervisors: Peter Aries, Bill Keil, Jay Sarbry, Tony Guy, Don Patterson, Mark Glamack
 Assistant Animation Supervisor: Bob Goe
 Animation Coordination: John Boersema, David Thwaytes
 Animation Direction: Maurice Pooley
 Animation: Ed Aardal, Carlos Alfonso, Ed Barge, Bob Bemiller, Oliver Callahan, George Cannata, Bob Carr, Rudy Cataldi, Steve Clark, Jesse Cosio, Marija Dail, Ed DeMattia, Izzy Ellis, Marcia Fertig, Kenneth Gaebler, John Garling, Mark Glamack, Fernando González, Alan Green, Terry Harrison, Bob Hathcock,  Volus Jones, Ray Kelley, Rick Leon, Hicks Lokey, Ernesto López, Tony Love, Ken Muse, Constantin Mustater, Frank Nakielski, Margaret Nichols, Eduardo Olivares, Joan Orbison, Rod Parkes, Don Patterson, John Perkins, Bill Pratt, Anna Lois Ray, Tom Ray, Morey Reden, Phil Robertson, Joanna Romersa, George Rowley, Veve Rusto, Ed Soloman, Ivy Spence, Ken Southworth, Leo Sullivan, Dave Tendlar, Dick Thompson, Richard Trueblood, Carlo Vinci, Russell Von Neida, James Wang, James T. Walker, John Walker, Rosemary Welch, Muise Williams, Allen Wilzbach
 Background Supervisor: Al Gmuer
 Backgrounds: Deborah Akers, Kathleen Alfaro, Fernando Arce, Daniela Bielecka, Jim Coleman, Dennis Durrell, Martin Forte, Bob Gentle, David High, Michael Humphaies, Jimmy Johns, Alison Julian, Richard Khim, Gary Niblett, Walter Peregoy, Andy Phillipson, Bill Procter, Michael Reinman, Jeff Richards, Jeff Riche, Craig Robertson, Gary Selvecchio, Marilyn Shimokochi, Dick Thomas, Stephen Thompson, Peter Van Elk, Gloria Wood
 Checking and Scene Planning: Evelyn Sherwood, Cindy Smith, Debbie Smith, Charlotte Finney
 Xerography: Robert "Tiger" West, Star Wirth
 Ink and Paint Supervisors: Roberta Groutert, Billie Kerns
 Sound Direction: William Getty, Richard Olson
 Camera: John Aardal, Reba Bement, George Epperson, Chuck Flekal, Curt Hall, Ron Jackson, Ralph Migliori, Cliff Shirpser, Jerry Smith, Terry Smith, Roy Wade, Brandy Whittington, Jerry Whittington
 Supervising Film Editors: Larry Cowan, Dick Elliott, Chip Yaras
 Dubbing Supervisor: Pat Foley
 Music Editors: W.R. Kowalchuck, Joe Sandusky, James Yaras 
 Show Editor: Gil Iverson
 Film Editors: Richard Allen, Earl Bennett, Milton Krear, Terry Moore, Joe Sandusky, Greg Watson
 Effects Editors: Tom Gleason, Scott Hecker, Milton Krear, Mark Mangini
 Negative Consultant: William E. DeBoer
 Production Manager: Jayne Barbera
 Production Supervisor: Jerry Smith
 Post Production Supervisor: Joed Eaton
 A HANNA-BARBERA PRODUCTION. Hanna-Barbera Productions, Inc. ©MCMLXXVII-MCMLXXX All Rights Reserved.

Home media

United Kingdom VHS releases

DVD
On July 23, 2013, Warner Archive Collection released Captain Caveman and the Teen Angels: The Complete Series on manufacture-on-demand (MOD) DVD in region 1 as part of their Hanna–Barbera Classics Collection.

References

External links
 Freddy Corven's Captain Caveman Page
 Captain Caveman at Don Markstein's Toonopedia. Archived from the original on April 9, 2012.
 Cartoon Legends' Captain Caveman
 Captain Caveman and the Teen Angels at Big Cartoon DataBase
 
 

1970s American animated television series
1977 American television series debuts
1980s American animated television series
1980 American television series endings
American animated television spin-offs
American Broadcasting Company original programming
American children's animated adventure television series
American children's animated comedy television series
American children's animated fantasy television series
American children's animated mystery television series
American children's animated superhero television series
American detective television series
Captain Caveman and the Teen Angels
English-language television shows
Fictional cryonically preserved characters
Fictional prehistoric characters
Hanna-Barbera characters
Hanna-Barbera superheroes
Television series about cavemen
Teen animated television series
Teen superhero television series
Television shows adapted into comics
Television series by Hanna-Barbera
Television series created by Joe Ruby
Television series created by Ken Spears
The Flintstones
Comedy franchises